Shirley Wong is a 1989 album recorded by Chinese Cantopop singer Faye Wong when she was based in Hong Kong, then using the stage name Shirley Wong. This is her debut album with Cinepoly.

Track listing
無奈那天 (Mou Noi Naa Tin) - However That Day
藉口 (Ze Hau) - Excuses
有緣的話 (Jau Jyun Dik Waa) - If Destined
溫柔的手 (Wan Jau Dik Sau) - Delicate Hands
尾班車 (Mei Baan Ce) - Last Train
未平復的心 (Mei Ping Fuk Dik Sam) - The Unsettled Heart<Duet with Paul Wong>
仍是舊句子 (Jing Si Gau Geoi Zi) - Still The same Old Phrase
中間人 (Zung Gaan Jan) - Torn Between Two Lovers
愛聽謊言 (Oi Ting Fong Jin) - Like Listening To Lies
新生 (San Sang) - New Life

References

1989 debut albums
Faye Wong albums
Cinepoly Records albums
Cantopop albums